Zaiyeh Kandi (also Romanized as Zāīyeh Kandī) is a village in Nazluy-ye Jonubi Rural District, in the Central District of Urmia County, West Azerbaijan Province, Iran. At the 2006 census, its population was 131, in 37 families.

References 

Populated places in Urmia County